Agoseris grandiflora is a North American species of flowering plant in the family Asteraceae known by the common names California dandelion, bigflower agoseris, and grassland agoseris.

The plant is native to western North America from British Columbia to California to Utah, where it grows in many habitat types.

Description
Agoseris grandiflora is a perennial herb producing a basal patch of leaves of various shapes reaching maximum lengths of 50 centimeters. There is usually no stem, but there is sometimes a rudimentary one.

The upright part of the plant is actually the peduncle of the inflorescence, which can approach a meter in height. It is coated in soft white hairs.

The flower head at the top is up to 4 centimeters wide and lined with reddish or purplish green phyllaries with curling tips. The head is ligulate, containing many yellow ray florets but no disc florets.

The fruit is an achene which may be nearly 3 centimeters long, including a long beak and long white pappus. It grows in meadows and forest openings.

Varieties
Agoseris grandiflora var. grandiflora
Agoseris grandiflora var. leptophylla

References

External links
Jepson Manual Treatment of Agoseris grandiflora
United States Department of Agriculture Plants Profile for Agoseris grandiflora
Agoseris grandiflora — Calphotos Photo gallery, University of California

grandiflora
Flora of the Northwestern United States
Flora of British Columbia
Flora of California
Flora of Nevada
Flora of Utah
Natural history of the California chaparral and woodlands
Natural history of the California Coast Ranges
Natural history of the Peninsular Ranges
Natural history of the San Francisco Bay Area
Natural history of the Santa Monica Mountains
Natural history of the Transverse Ranges
Plants described in 1841
Taxa named by Edward Lee Greene
Taxa named by Thomas Nuttall
Flora without expected TNC conservation status